The 1981 Winston Western 500 was a NASCAR Winston Cup Series race that took place on January 11, 1981, at Riverside International Raceway in Riverside, California.

This race would be the final race where 115-inch wheelbase cars were eligible to run; the field was a mix of older cars and 1981 105-inch wheelbase models. Dale Earnhardt drove a 1981 Pontiac while race winner Bobby Allison drove a 1977 Monte Carlo.

Summary
While January 11, 1981, started out as a typical rainy day on the West Coast during the winter months, the showers had disappeared around the time of the race.

There were 36 drivers on the grid; all of them were American-born except for Canadian Roy Smith. The last place finisher was Cecil Gordon in his Chevrolet due to engine problems on lap 2 out of 119. Bobby Allison defeated Terry Labonte in front of 35,000 spectators. There were 15 lead changes and six cautions for 31 laps; making the race last three hours and sixteen minutes in length. The other drivers in the top ten were: Dale Earnhardt, Richard Childress, Richard Petty, Jim Robinson, Jody Ridley, Elliott Forbes-Robinson, Buddy Arrington, and Don Waterman. Robinson was declared the winner of the West Series division of this combination race.

Notable crew chiefs who actively participated in the race included Junie Donvaley, Jake Elder, Joey Arrington, Darrell Dieringer, Darrell Bryant, Dale Inman, Waddell Wilson, Bud Moore, and Kirk Shelmerdine.

Ricky Rudd would start his "Ironman" streak of being in the NASCAR Cup Series for 24 seasons without missing a single race. The next race after this one would see cars become boxier and smaller; like the compact cars that were trendy in America during the 1980s. West Coast racer John Borneman, a registered West Series driver, finished 12th in this combination race, earning a third-place finish in the West Series standings under NASCAR's combination race policy.  Though it would be his last Cup start, Borneman (whose son would later race at the national level) was primarily a regular at San Diego's Cajon Speedway. This was the final time in NASCAR history that a race would take place prior to the Daytona 500. Also, this race would be the last time that a car owned by a member of the Petty family would have Chevrolet as a manufacturer until the year 2018.

Road course ringer Bob Bondurant made his first Cup race. Harry Dinwiddie and Don Sprouse failed to qualify for the race.

Standings after the race

References

Winston Western 500 (January)
Winston Western 500 (January)
NASCAR races at Riverside International Raceway